Eophasma is a genus of fossil nematodes from the Jurassic of Osteno in Lombardy, Italy. It has only one species, Eophasma jurasicum.

In 2011, the genus was placed in the new family Eophasmidae Poinar, 2011, which is itself placed in the order Desmoscolecida, superfamily Desmoscolecoidea.

References 

†Eophasma
Prehistoric protostome genera
Jurassic invertebrates
Fossils of Italy